John Hollis Bankhead I (September 13, 1842 – March 1, 1920) was a U.S. senator from Alabama
John Hollis Bankhead II (July 8, 1872 – June 12, 1946) was a U.S. senator from Alabama